Outer dense fiber protein 1 is a protein that in humans is encoded by the ODF1 gene.

The outer dense fibers are cytoskeletal structures that surround the axoneme in the middle piece and principal piece of the sperm tail. The fibers function in maintaining the elastic structure and recoil of the sperm tail as well as in protecting the tail from shear forces during epididymal transport and ejaculation. Defects in the outer dense fibers lead to abnormal sperm morphology and infertility. The human outer dense fibers contains at least 10 major proteins and this gene encodes the main protein.

References

Further reading